Statistics of Soviet Top League for the 1982 season.

Overview
It was contested by 18 teams, and Dinamo Minsk won the championship.

The rules stated that a team could only have a maximum of 10 draws; all points from matches draw since the eleventh wouldn't be counted.

League standings

Results

Top scorers
23 goals
 Andrei Yakubik (Pakhtakor)

18 goals
 Merab Megreladze (Torpedo Kutaisi)

16 goals
 Ramaz Shengelia (Dinamo Tbilisi)
 Aleksandr Tarkhanov (CSKA)

13 goals
 Igor Gurinovich (Dinamo Minsk)

12 goals
 Boris Chukhlov (Zenit)
 Valery Gazzaev (Dynamo Moscow)
 Khoren Hovhannisyan (Ararat)
 Andrei Redkous (Torpedo Moscow)
 Mykhaylo Sokolovsky (Shakhtar)

Medal squads
(league appearances and goals listed in brackets)

Number of teams by union republic

References
Soviet Union - List of final tables (RSSSF)

Soviet Top League seasons
1
Soviet
Soviet